SS Viking was a wooden-hulled sealing ship made famous by its role in the 1931 film The Viking. During her use in the seal hunt in Newfoundland, the ship was twice commissioned by the film crew. During production, an explosion destroyed the ship, resulting in the loss of the director, Varick Frissell, and the cinematographer, Alexander Gustavus Penrod, in addition to the lives of 26 of the ships' crew and film crew.

History

In 1881, Viking was built by the Nylands Shipyard at Christiania, Norway, the same location where another famous Newfoundland vessel, Southern Cross, was constructed. Viking was a vessel of 310 gross tons and equipped with a  auxiliary engine. She was launched in 1882 from the Nylands Shipyard.

Viking sailed for a number of years hunting the saddleback seal off the coast of Greenland. In 1882, Norwegian explorer, scientist and diplomat Fridtjof Nansen used her for his first Arctic expedition.

In 1904, Viking was purchased by Bowring Brothers of St. John's, Newfoundland for the sealing industry. She was placed under the command of Captain William Bartlett, who remained her master until 1923. Subsequently, she was skippered by G. Whitley (1927), I. Barbour (1928, 1929) and R. Badcock (1930).

Viking was the smallest of the Bowring Brothers fleet, but was capable of carrying 276 men.

Feature film
With funding from Paramount Pictures, S.S. Viking was chartered by the newly formed Newfoundland-Labrador Film Company to make a feature film set against the annual seal hunt off the coast of Newfoundland. In 1930, Varick Frissell, the director of the actuality scenes (but not of the fictional scenes), and his crew sailed to the ice floes aboard SS Ungava and subsequently the same spring aboard Viking. Viking was commanded on this second voyage in 1930 by Captain Bob Bartlett (the son of Captain William Bartlett, Viking'''s first skipper), who was also cast in the role of the fictitious skipper, Captain Barker.White Thunder, the film's original name, was screened early in 1931, at the Nickel Theatre in St. John's. Paramount declined to release the film. Hoping to strengthen White Thunder with additional footage, Frissell, along with cinematographer, A. G. Penrod, H. Sargent, and their assistants, again chartered passage on Viking.

 Fate 
On March 9, 1931, the ship, skippered by Captain Abram Kean, Jr., left port. She carried 138 sealers and two stowaways, in addition to the film crew.

Late in the day on March 15, 1931, heavy ice was encountered off White Bay. Captain Keane ordered the ship butted into the ice jam to secure her for the night. At 9 p.m., an explosion blew the stern off the vessel, likely instantly killing the film crew in the saloon. The ship then caught fire,  leaving survivors to fend on the ice. Captain Abram Keane was badly hurt, but survived. Many of the survivors made the over-ice trek to Horse Island, 8 miles distant, while others were rescued by the steamers Foundation Franklin and Sagona, which had been dispatched to the area. In total the accident killed 28, including Frissell and Penrod. 

A later government commission could determine no more definitive cause for the sinking than that the explosives magazine had exploded. The report indicated that gunpowder had been mishandled. Sir Wilfred Grenfell noted in his introduction to the subsequently released film, The Viking, that dynamite was a routine item included in a sealing ship's provisions. It was required to free the ship, should it become ice-bound.

The ship's loss was the first for Bowring Brothers in 52 years.

References

Bibliography
 Rhodes, Gary Don. White Zombie: Anatomy of a Horror Film. Jefferson, North Carolina: McFarland & Company, 2001.  
 Rist, Peter. Guide to the Cinema(s) of Canada''. Westport, Connecticut: Greenwood Publishing Group, 2001.

External links
 
 
 Viking Shipwreck

1882 ships
Icebreakers of Norway
Steamships of Norway
Icebreakers of Canada
Steamships of Canada
Ships built in Oslo
Shipwrecks of the Newfoundland and Labrador coast
Maritime incidents in 1931
Bowring Brothers